Sailing/Yachting is an Olympic sport starting from the Games of the 1st Olympiad (1896 Olympics in Athens, Greece). With the exception of 1904 and the canceled 1916 Summer Olympics, sailing has always been included on the Olympic schedule. The Sailing program of 1960 consisted of a total of five sailing classes (disciplines). For each class seven races were scheduled from 29 August 1960 to 7 September 1960 off the coast of Naples at the Gulf of Naples.

The sailing was done on the triangular type Olympic courses. The start was made in the center of a set of 8 numbered marks that were places in a circle. During the starting procedure the sequence of the marks was communicated to the sailors. By picking the mark that was most upwind the start could always be made upwind. This system is, at least in certain German lakes, still in use.

Venue 

In the Gulf of Naples, in the zone overlooking Santa Lucia, three ports were used for launching and mooring of the Olympic classes:
 Mergellina, for Finn (Sea Garden) and Flying Dutchman (Posillipo)
 Borgo Marinari, for Dragons
 Molosiglio, for Star and 5.5 Metre

Three course areas were used:

Competition

Overview

Continents 
 Africa
 Asia
 Oceania
 Europe
 Americas

Countries

Classes (equipment) 

 = Male,  = Female,  = Open

Medal summary

Medal table

Remarks

Measurement 
Measurement at the Olympics became more and more professional.

Sailing 
 Again this Olympic sailing event was gender independent, but turned out to be a Men-only event. This was one of the triggers to create gender specific events. This however had to wait until 1988.
 Since the distance between Rome and Naples a separate organization was created for the Sailing events. The name of this organization was Solo Mio.
 The Italian Navy was responsible for the courses and the towing in and out of the yachts. According to the official report this was done on a very prompt manner. and we quote:
The only accident to occur, which resulted in the loss of the Lebanese Flying Dutchman, cannot be imputed to the method employed by the rescue crew after the boat had overturned, but to the incompetence of the Lebanese F.D. crew who attached the tow cable around a belaying cleat fixed to the deck.
 According to current standards a huge amount of sails was allowed for use during the Olympics (not every boat measured in the maximum number):
 Finn, 1 sail (for the whole Finn fleet a total of 25 sails were available as spare.)
 Flying Dutchman, 4 sets of sails (12)
 Star, 6 sets of sails (12)
 Dragon 6 sets of sails (18)
 5.5 Metre 6 sets of sails (18)
 106 journalists of 52 countries were reporting the sailing event.
 Many former Olympians acted in the race committee, the International jury or measurement committee. Examples are: Peter Scott, Beppe Croce, Eddy Stutterheim, Jean-Jacques Herbulot and Edgar Beyn.

Sailors 
During the sailing regattas at the 1960 Summer Olympics among others the following persons were competing in the various classes:
 , Gotfrid Köchert, father of actress Bibi Besch and future grandfather of actress Samantha Mathis, in the 5.5 Metre
 , Jock Sturrock in the 5.5 Metre. Appointed flag-bearer of the Australian team at the opening ceremony in Rome, in recognition of becoming the first athlete to represent Australia in four Olympic Games. Later, skippered "Gretel" and "Dame Pattie", the first two Australian challengers for the America's Cup, and in 1962 was awarded the Lindy Award as Australian Sportsman of the year, the Helms Award for Australian Yachtsman of the year, and was honoured as Australian of the Year
 , Paul Elvstrøm winning his fourth consecutive Gold medal, this time in the Finn
 , Crown Prince Constantine winning his first and only Gold medal, in the Dragon with two of his teammates. He would become king of Greece (1964–1973) as Constantine II
 , Peter Tallberg, future President of the International Yacht Racing Union (1986–1994), in the 5.5 Metre
 , Francisco Paula Gonzales, future mass murderer for crashing Pacific Air Lines Flight 773 (1964)
 , Birabongse Bhanudej, Prince of Thailand, in the Star

References

Sources
 
 
 

 

 
1960 Summer Olympics events
1960
1960 in sailing
Sailing competitions in Italy